Podao or pudao is a Chinese single-edged infantry weapon that is still used primarily for training in various Chinese martial arts. The blade of the weapon is shaped like a Chinese broadsword, but the weapon has a longer handle, usually around one to two meters (about three to six feet) which is circular in cross-section. It looks somewhat similar to the guandao.

The pudao is sometimes called a "horse-cutter sword" since it is speculated to have been used to slice the legs out from under a horse during battle (like the zhanmadao). It is somewhat analogous to the Japanese nagamaki, although the nagamaki sword may have been developed independently. The pudao also resembles the Korean hyeopdo.

Gallery

Popular culture
 Shang-Chi and the Legend of the Ten Rings features locations in Ta Lo as well as Razor Fist using podaos of dragon scales to fight the Dweller-in-Darkness.

Blade weapons
Chinese melee weapons
Chinese swords
Polearms
Weapons of China